Marcelo H. del Pilar Street, also known as M.H. del Pilar Street or simply Del Pilar Street, is a north–south road running for   connecting Ermita and Malate districts in Manila, Philippines. It is a two-lane street which carries traffic one-way southbound from Kalaw Avenue in Rizal Park to Quirino Avenue just across from the Ospital ng Maynila. It was formerly called Calle Real.

Calle Real

The street marks the original shoreline of Manila Bay as it existed during the Spanish colonial period. It was then known as Calle Real (Spanish for "royal street") which served as the national road that linked Manila with the southern provinces. 
The old coastal highway ran from Ermita to Muntinlupa passing through Pasay (where it is now known as Harrison Avenue), Parañaque (now known as Elpidio Quirino Avenue), and Las Piñas (now known as Diego Cera Avenue and Alabang–Zapote Road).

As with most other streets in Manila, it was renamed in 1921 after a Filipino writer and patriot, Marcelo Hilario del Pilar. It was also one of the right-of-way alignments of tranvía that existed until 1945.

Landmarks

Notable sites that are presently located on Del Pilar Street include the Ermita Church, LandBank Plaza, the Malate Church, Gaiety Theater as well as several hotel buildings such as the New World Manila Bay Hotel (formerly Hyatt Hotel & Casino) located at the intersection of Pedro Gil Street and Diamond Hotel.

References

See also
 List of renamed streets in Manila

Streets in Manila
Ermita
Malate, Manila